Josh Thomson (born 1981 in Timaru, New Zealand) is a New Zealand actor and comedian of Tongan heritage. He is best known for his work as a comedian on 7 Days, Taskmaster NZ, Have You Been Paying Attention NZ, Patriot Brains, and as a host on The Project NZ. 

As an actor he is best known as Bob, the assistant of Lia Maivia, in Young Rock, Satan in Wellington Paranormal and Pigsy in the Netflix series The New Legends of Monkey.

He has frequently collaborated with production house thedownlowconcept starring as the lead in their movie Gary of the Pacific. He starred in and directed his own father in the award-winning web series Subject:Dad. 

In 2021, Thomson appeared on the panel show Patriot Brains. Thomson won series 3 of Taskmaster NZ.

In 2023, Thomson appeared on an episode of Guy Montgomery's Guy Mont-Spelling Bee.

References

1981 births
21st-century New Zealand male actors
Date of birth missing (living people)
Living people
New Zealand male comedians
New Zealand people of Tongan descent
People from Timaru